Tysyn Hartman (born August 9, 1989) is a former American football safety. Hartman was signed as an undrafted free agent by the Kansas City Chiefs of the National Football League in 2012. He also played for the Omaha Mammoths of the Fall Experimental Football League (FXFL). He played college football for Kansas State University. He attended high school at Kapaun Mt. Carmel Catholic High School in Wichita, Kansas.

External links
Kansas City Chiefs bio
Kansas State Wildcats bio

1989 births
Living people
Players of American football from Wichita, Kansas
American football safeties
Kansas State Wildcats football players
Kansas City Chiefs players
Omaha Mammoths players
People from Hays, Kansas